A bill and hold transaction occurs when a company recognizes revenue before delivery takes place. Normally a revenue is not recognizable until  goods are delivered or services are rendered. Exceptions are made when a customer specifically  requests that the vendor delay delivery  and has a legitimate business reason for the request.

Alleged abuse by Nortel
Nortel Networks Corporation was a multinational telecommunications equipment manufacturer headquartered in Mississauga, Ontario, Canada. During and right after the optical boom years, Nortel allegedly used bill and hold transactions
to inflate the company's revenues during some quarters, allowing company executives to earn millions in bonuses.

References

Accounting in the United States
Ethically disputed business practices
Accounting terminology
Finance fraud
Nortel